UIC may refer to:

Education
 University of Illinois Chicago, a public four-year university in Chicago, Illinois, United States
 UIC Flames, the intercollegiate athletic program of the University of Illinois Chicago
 Underwood International College, a department of Yonsei University, South Korea
 United International College, a liberal arts college in China

Government
 Uganda Insurance Commission, a government agency
 Unit Identification Code, an alphanumeric code used by the United States Department of Defense
 Underground Injection Control Program, a U.S. environmental regulatory program

Organisations
 International Union of Railways (Union Internationale des Chemins de fer), an international rail transport industry body
 UEFA Intertoto Cup, an association football tournament for member clubs of UEFA
 Union of Islamic Courts, an armed group in Somalia, now called the "Supreme Islamic Courts Council" 
 United Industrial Corporation Ltd, a Singapore real estate holding company owned by JG Summit Holdings
 Uttarakhand Information Commission, a state government organisation of Uttarakhand, India

Computing
 Uranium Information Centre, a defunct website sponsored by uranium mining companies
 User identification code, the user number of the Files-11 file system in the RSX-11 operating system